William Leonard was a Medal of Honor recipient in the United States Army during the Plains Indian Wars. While serving as a private in Company L, 2nd U.S. Cavalry, he fought in an action against Indians at the Battle of Little Muddy Creek in Montana Territory on May 7, 1877.

Medal of Honor citation
Rank and organization: Private, Company L, 2nd United States Cavalry. Place and date: At Muddy Creek, Montana, May 7, 1877. Entered service at: United States. Birth: Ypsilanti, Michigan, United States. Date of issue: August 8, 1877.

Citation:

Bravery in action.

See also

List of Medal of Honor recipients for the Indian Wars

References

American people of the Indian Wars
United States Army Medal of Honor recipients
United States Army soldiers
American Indian Wars recipients of the Medal of Honor